Mammillaria lasiacantha is a species of cactus in the subfamily Cactoideae, with the common names lacespine nipple cactus, small pincushion cactus, and biznaga de espinas pubescentes (Spanish).

Distribution
This wide-ranging species occurs in the Mexican states of Coahuila and Durango and U.S. states of Arizona and New Mexico, and Texas. It has also been reported from Chihuahua, Nuevo León, San Luis Potosí, Sonora and Zacatecas in Mexico.

The cactus grows on limestone soils of hills and tablelands in desert habitats.

Conservation
This cactus is illegally collected and grown as an ornamental plant. It is on the IUCN Red List, and threats are illegal collection for the horticultural trade and possibly land use changes.

References

External links

lasiacantha
Cacti of Mexico
Cacti of the United States
Flora of Arizona
Flora of Coahuila
Flora of Durango
Flora of New Mexico
Flora of Texas
Plants described in 1856
Taxa named by George Engelmann
Least concern flora of the United States